The Sisters of Charity of Montreal, formerly called The Sisters of Charity of the Hôpital Général of Montreal and more commonly known as the Grey Nuns of Montreal, is a Canadian religious institute of Roman Catholic religious sisters, founded in 1737 by Marguerite d'Youville, a young widow.

History

The congregation was founded when Marguerite d'Youville and three of her friends formed a religious association to care for the poor. They rented a small house in Montreal on 30 October 1738, taking in a small number of destitute persons. On 3 June 1753 the society received royal sanction, which also transferred to them the rights and privileges previously granted by letters patent in 1694 to the Frères Hospitaliers de la Croix et de Saint-Joseph, known after their founder as the Frères Charon. At that time they also took over the work of the bankrupt Frères Charon at the Hôpital Général de Montréal located outside the city walls. (In the seventeenth century, a "general hospital" was an institution that took in old people, the ill, and the poor. Medical care was dispensed at the Hôtel Dieu.)

In 1755 the sisters cared for those stricken during a smallpox epidemic. As the sisters were not cloistered, they could go out to visit the sick. Those assisted included the First Nations people in Oka, who were among the benefactors who later helped rebuild the hospital after a fire in 1765.

After 1840, the order rapidly expanded, and over the next 100 years became a major provider of health care and other social services throughout Quebec, Western and Northern Canada, and the northern United States. In 1855, the Grey Nuns were called to Toledo, Ohio, to care for many suffering from cholera. St. Vincent's later became part of Catholic Health Partners.

St. Joseph Hospital was founded in 1906 in Nashua, by the parish of St. Louis de Gonzague primarily to serve Nashua's French Canadian community. The Sisters of Charity of Montreal began to staff it in 1907. The hospital was dedicated on 1 May 1908, the Feast of St. Joseph the Worker. The sister also started a nursing school. In 1938, the parish transferred ownership to the "Grey Nuns".

In 1983 the Sisters of Charity of Montreal established Covenant Health Systems, a non-profit Catholic regional health care system, to direct, support and conduct their health care, elder care and social service systems throughout New England. In 1996, sponsorship of St. Joseph Hospital in Nashua was transferred from the Grey Nuns to Covenant Health Systems.

Participation in the residential school system 

The Sisters worked as nurses and teachers in a number of Indian Residential Schools, as the preferred missionary partners of the Missionary Oblates of Mary Immaculate, who were not allowed to teach girls. The Oblates paid parents to allow their children to attend boarding schools. At the schools, they participated in the effort to remove children from their traditional Indigenous ways of life, in order to "civilize" them.

The main goal of the Oblates and the Grey Nuns was to provide a Catholic education (in competition with schools operated by Anglicans) and to give limited secular education. These early mission boarding schools never recruited more than a small percentage
of the number of school-aged children in the region. Though often at odds, the Canadian government and the various religious organizations operating residential schools agreed that Indigenous cultural practices had to be suppressed.

Students at the schools were subjected to physical and Sexual abuse; insufficient food; and being forbidden to speak their native languages or engage in their cultural practices. This treatment has been deemed cultural genocide by the final report of the Truth and Reconciliation Commission.

The Sisters worked at one of the most notorious schools, St. Anne's Indian Residential School (located in Fort Albany, Ontario), where a homemade electric chair was reportedly used on the children for the amusement of the staff, among other severe abuses. Survivor testimony later sparked a long-running OPP investigation; two nuns were eventually convicted of assault for their actions at St Anne's. The Sisters also worked at the Holy Angels Residential School in Fort Chipewyan. The Mikisew Cree First Nation, Athabasca Chipewyan First Nation and Fort Chipewyan Métis Community have hired archaeologists from the University of Alberta to search the grounds of the school for unmarked graves reported by former students. The search began in March 2022.

Other residential schools where the sisters worked include Île-à-la-Crosse Residential School, Lac la Biche (Notre Dame des Victoires) Residential School, St. Albert (Youville) Residential School, Qu'Appelle Indian Residential School, St. Boniface Residential School, Assiniboia Indian Residential School, Shubenacadie Indian Residential School, Fort Providence Residential School, Blue Quills Residential School, the residence at Fort Smith, Fort Resolution Indian Residential School, and Chesterfield Inlet (Turquetil Hall) Residential School.

The Sisters and the Oblates objected to the characterization of their actions during the IRSSA process, stating that they felt many students had positive experiences and that some of their members had been falsely accused.

, the Sisters had not turned over several thousand photos and records which they had promised to return to the National Centre for Truth and Reconciliation. , the Catholic Church as a whole had not issued a formal apology for its role in the residential school system, although some dioceses and orders had issued their own apologies.

Name
The city residents mocked the nuns by calling them "les grises" – a phrase meaning both "the grey women" and "the drunken women", in reference to the color of their attire and d'Youville's late husband, François-Magdeleine You d’Youville (1700–1730), a notorious bootlegger. Marguerite d'Youville and her colleagues adopted the particular black and beige dress of their religious institute in 1755: despite a lack of grey colour, they kept the nickname. When a Grey Nun worked as a nurse in a hospital, she usually exchanged her taupe habit for a white one. They wore a bonnet instead of a veil, as that was more practical for everyday work.

Constitution
The rule given to Marguerite d'Youville and her companions by the Sulpician priest, Father Louis Normant de Faradon, P.S.S, in 1745 received episcopal sanction in 1754, when Monseigneur de Pontbriant formed the society into an official religious community. This rule forms the basis of the present constitution, which was approved by Pope Leo XIII on 30 July 1880. Besides the three vows of poverty, chastity, and obedience, the sisters pledge themselves to devote their lives to the service of suffering humanity.

Sister communities

The sisters undertook the first mission by a female religious institute to Western Canada in 1844, when a colony of Grey Nuns left their convent in Montreal and travelled to Saint Boniface, on the shore of the Red River. Several sister communities branched off from the Sisters of Charity of Montreal:

Sisters of Charity of Saint-Hyacinthe
The congregation was founded by Marie-Michel-Archange Thuot (Mother Thuot). She joined the Grey nuns in 1803. She served in the infirmary and pharmacy, and later became mistress of novices. In 1840, Thuot and three other sisters left Montreal to establish a community in the rural farming community of Saint-Hyacinthe, Quebec, and soon founded the Hotel-Dieu for their health care ministry. As a way to raise funds to support themselves and their ministry, they also took in female pensionnaires.

In response to increased industrialization of the area, in 1864 they founded the workhouse of Saint Geneviève to " procure work for the poor women when they are unable to find any on the outside." The workhouse produced woollen fabric and soap, and provided employment for ten women, fifteen girls, one man, and three boys. They became a separate pontifical congregation in 1896.

In 1888 the sisters founded the first hospital in Lewiston, Maine, called variously "the Sisters' Hospital", "the French Hospital", or "the Catholic Hospital". In 1902 the Sisters moved to a larger building that came to be called L'Hopital Generale Ste. Marie - St. Mary's General Hospital. St. Mary's developed into Saint Mary's Regional Medical Center.

Grey Nuns of the Sacred Heart

The only American congregation of Grey Nuns, the Grey Nuns of the Sacred Heart branched off from the Ottawa congregation in 1921, to establish an independent English-speaking congregation to minister in the United States. They founded D'Youville College in Buffalo, New York. In 1966, the mother house moved to Yardley, Pennsylvania. The sisters serve in a variety of ministries in the East Coast states New York, Pennsylvania and Massachusetts as well as in Georgia and Alaska.

the Sisters of Charity of the Hôtel-Dieu of Nicolet (1886), branched off from Saint-Hyacinthe, united with Montreal (1941)
 the Sisters of Charity of Ottawa (1845) formerly the Grey Nuns of the Cross
 the Grey Sisters of the Immaculate Conception (1926), branched off from Ottawa
 the Sisters of Charity of Quebec (1849)

The 21st century

As of 2008 the various Grey Nun branches operate in Canada, the United States, Colombia, Brazil, Japan, Haiti, Central African Republic, South Africa, Papua New Guinea, Paraguay, Argentina, Uruguay, Bahamas, and the Dominican Republic.

Hospitals
They once operated a number of major hospitals in Canada; as provincial governments and church, authorities moved to standardize both ownership and operation of hospitals, many of these hospitals passed into the hands of Church corporations (or, in some cases, governmental organizations) and the Grey Nuns changed focus.  The Grey Nuns' Hospital building built in 1765 in Montreal was designated a national Historic Site of Canada in 1973 to commemorate the Grey Nuns. In 2011, Grey Nuns Motherhouse, the former motherhouse of the Grey Nuns in Montreal, now part of Concordia University, was also designated a National Historic Site.

Shelters
They now operate shelters for battered women (with and without children), shelters for women in need, clothing and food dispensaries, centres for the disabled, and some health care facilities. St. Boniface General Hospital in Winnipeg is still owned by the Grey Nuns; hospitals previously owned, operated, or enlarged by the institute include the former Holy Cross Hospital in Calgary, St. Paul's Hospital in Saskatoon, and the Grey Nuns Community Hospital in Edmonton. Many of these health care institutions were founded by missionary nuns sent out from convents in Quebec and Ontario.

Other works
Grey Nuns may work with the incarcerated. Some chapters are also dedicated to peace and justice; at least one chapter, the Grey Nuns of the Sacred Heart, has declared its properties a nuclear-free zone.

Classification as religious sisters
Although the institute's informal name contains the word "nuns", members are actually classified by the Roman Catholic Church as religious sisters, as they are not cloistered and belong to a congregation, not an order. They no longer wear their distinctive habit and now wear street clothes.

Numbers
In 1993 it was estimated that there were just under 3,000 Grey Nuns in Canada, mainly in Quebec and Ontario. By 2013 they will vacate their Mother House in downtown Montreal, after having sold the property to Concordia University in 2005. As of 2014 there were about 136 nuns in the Montreal congregation, whose average age was around 85. The Quebec congregation has not recruited any new members since before 2000. Sister Bernadette said the nuns' legacy will live on in other ways.

See also
 Covenant Health Systems

References

Further reading
The Grey Nuns and the Red River Settlement by Dennis King. Toronto: Book Society of Canada, 1980. 
Mother d'Youville, First Canadian Foundress by Albertine-Ferland Angers. Montreal: Sisters of Charity of Montreal, Grey Nuns, 2000.

External links
 Grey Nuns of Montreal Home Page
 Sisters of Charity of Saint-Hyacinthe Home Page
 Sisters of Charity of Ottawa Home Page
 Sisters of Charity of Quebec Home Page
 Grey Nuns of the Sacred Heart Home Page
 Grey Sisters of the Immaculate Conception Home Page
 Manitoba Historical Society – The Grey Nuns and the Red River Settlement
 Ward, Sister Mary Elizabeth. "Grey Nuns." The Catholic Encyclopedia Vol. 7. New York: Robert Appleton Company, 1910
 

1738 establishments in the French colonial empire
Religious organizations established in the 1730s
Christian organizations based in Canada
History of Catholicism in Canada
Catholic female orders and societies
History of Montreal
Organizations based in Montreal
Christian organizations established in the 18th century
History of women in Canada